Yelizaveta Palmenbach (1761–1832) was an Imperial Russian pedagogue, the principal of the Smolny Institute in Saint Petersburg from 1797 to 1802, and a lady-in-waiting.

Biography 
Yeliaveta was born into 1761 to Alexander Ivanovich Cherkasov and Hedvig Elizabeth von Biron, known as Ekaterina Ivanovna. Her brother was Peter von Biron. She was eduacated at the Smolny Institute of Noble Maidens, after her graduation in 1779, she bacame maid of honour. She married Colonel Evstafy (Gustav) Ivanovich Palmenbach on 16 August 1780 in Saint Isaac's Cathedral.

In 1796, she was appointed assistant to Sophie de Lafont, the head of the Smolny intitute. De Lafon dies in August 1797,  afterwhich Ekaterina became head of the institution, and attiained the title of Excellency. She held this position until 1802.

She was close with Empress Maria Feodorovna who entrusted her with the education of two daughters of A. Kh. Bechendorff, and the princesses Biron. She was awarded the Order of Saint Catherine, small cross in 1801.

She died in Saint Petersburg 23 June 1832, and was buried in the Smolensky Cemetery. The following inscription is written on her monument:"Here lies the body of the cavalry lady Elizaveta Alexandrovna Palmenbach, born Baroness Cherkasova, who died on June 23 1832, at the age of 71."She and her husband had three daughters:

 Sophia (1781-1839) married Senator P. L. Batyushkov
 Alexandra (1784-1836) married Senator A. Ya. Buhler
 Ekaterina

References

 Сухарева О.В. Кто был кто в России от Петра I до Павла I, Москва, 2005

1761 births
1832 deaths
Educators from the Russian Empire
Governesses from the Russian Empire
Ladies-in-waiting from the Russian Empire
Nobility from the Russian Empire
Baltic German people from the Russian Empire
Heads of schools in the Russian Empire
19th-century women educators